Stein Lier-Hansen (born 9 May 1955) is a Norwegian organizational director and politician for the Labour Party.

From 1988 to 1993 he was the general secretary of the Norwegian Association of Hunters and Anglers, an organization with more than 100,000 members. He then became assisting director of the Norwegian Directorate for Nature Management in 1993, and director in 1995.

During Stoltenberg's First Cabinet, Lier-Hansen was appointed State Secretary in the Ministry of the Environment. He held the position until after the 2001 elections, which caused the cabinet to fall.

In 2004 he became CEO of the Federation of Norwegian Process Industries, named Federation of Norwegian Industries since a 2006 merger, an organization under the Confederation of Norwegian Enterprise umbrella. He succeeded Per Terje Vold.

References

1955 births
Living people
Labour Party (Norway) politicians
Norwegian state secretaries
Directors of government agencies of Norway